Casimir Reuterskiöld (14 September 1883 – 25 December 1953) was a Swedish sport shooter who competed in the 1920 Summer Olympics. He won a silver medal in the team free pistol competition and finished eighth individually.

Reuterskiöld was a career military officer. At the time of the 1920 Olympics he held a rank of captain and was one of the most experienced shooters in the Swedish pistol team, having won two bronze medals at the 1913 World Championships. He retired from the service as a major.

References

External links
profile

1883 births
1953 deaths
Swedish male sport shooters
ISSF pistol shooters
Olympic shooters of Sweden
Shooters at the 1920 Summer Olympics
Olympic silver medalists for Sweden
Olympic medalists in shooting
Medalists at the 1920 Summer Olympics
19th-century Swedish nobility
20th-century Swedish people